This is an article about qualification for the 2015 Women's European Volleyball Championship.

Qualification summary
Qualified teams

Hosts

Directly qualified after 2013 edition

Qualified through qualification
Group A: 
Group B: 
Group C: 
Group D: 
Group E: 
Group F: 
Play-off 1: 
Play-off 2: 
Play-off 3:

First round
First round was held from May 9, 2014 to May 11, 2014. The two group winners and two second place qualified directly for the second round.

All times are local.

Pool A
The tournament was held at Halmstad Arena in Halmstad, Sweden.

|}

|}

Pool B
The tournament was held at Topolica Sport Hall in Bar, Montenegro.

|}

|}

Second round
First round was held from May 16, 2014, to June 1, 2014.

All times are local.

Group A
The tournament was held at Sk "Olimpiets" in Mogilev, Belarus and İzmir Atatürk Sport Hall, in Izmir, Turkey.

|}

 Tournament 1 in Belarus

|}

 Tournament 2 in Turkey

|}

Group B
The tournament was held at Pista Ghiaccio Resega in Lugano, Switzerland and Łuczniczka, in Bydgoszcz, Poland.

|}

 Tournament 1 in Switzerland

|}

 Tournament 2 in Poland

|}

Group C
The tournament was held at Pabellón deportivo "El Plantío" in Coslada, Spain and Městská sportovní hala, in Plzeň, Czech Republic.

|}

 Tournament 1 in Spain

|}

 Tournament 2 in Czech Republic

|}

Group D
The tournament was held at "Hristo Botev" Sport Hall in Sofia, Bulgaria and A.Y.S. Sport Hall, in Baku, Azerbaijan.

|}

 Tournament 1 in Bulgaria

|}

 Tournament 2 in Azerbaijan

|}

Group E
The tournament was held at Palais des Sports in Moulins, France and Hesegi Sport Hall - Wingate Institute, in Netanya, Israel.

|}

 Tournament 1 in France

|}

 Tournament 2 in Israel

|}

Group F
The tournament was held at Budocenter in Wien, Austria and Polyvalent Hall, in Piatra Neamţ, Romania.

|}

 Tournament 1 in Austria

|}

 Tournament 2 in Romania

|}

Third round 
First round was held from May 23, 2015, to May 30, 2015. The 2nd placed teams of the Second Round will play one home and one away match to determine the 3 winners who will then subsequently be qualified through to the 2015 Championship.

All times are local.

|}
1 Azerbaijan won the golden set 15–6

First leg

|}

Second leg

|}

External links
Official site 

Women's European Volleyball Championships
European Volleyball Championships
European Volleyball Championships
Qualification for volleyball competitions